The Communist Party of Pridnestrovie (KPP; , Moldovan Cyrillic: Партидул Комунист дин Нистрения;) was a communist party in Transnistria, led by Vladimir Gavrilchenko. It was described by state media as the more "conservative" communist party in comparison to the Pridnestrovie Communist Party (PCP).

Overview 
The Communist Party of Pridnestrovie maintains close contacts with groups in Russia. It was affiliated with the Communist Party of the Soviet Union led by Oleg Shenin, and it usually refers to itself by its abbreviation KPP-KPSS. However, it had no representation in Transnistria's Supreme Council.

It supported independent statehood for Transnistria and opposed the administration of President Igor Smirnov. It provided no candidate to run in the 10 December 2006 presidential election, but lent its support Nadezhda Bondarenko, the candidate of the competing Pridnestrovie Communist Party, who obtained 8.1% of the vote.

During the presidential elections of 2011, Vladimir Gavrilchenko did not run for president himself. He announced his support for Igor Smirnov instead. He also entered the pro-presidential People's Union, which consists of 20 different public organizations and civic unions. After results of the first round were announced on 12 December 2011, and it became obvious that acting president Igor Smirnov lost the elections, Vladimir Gavrilchenko with other supporters appeared on the special meeting of the People's Union and called to nullify the results of the elections, to change the composition of the Central Elections Commission and to introduce a state of emergency in Transnistria in order to give Smirnov the ability to remain in power. 

However, as Igor Smirnov decided to step down peacefully, nothing transpired from these demands. On 11 March 2013 Vladimir Gavrilchenko died at the age of 63. After his death, the Communist Party of Pridnestrovie collapsed with the majority of its members joining the Pridnestrovie Communist Party of Oleg Khorzhan.

References 

Communist parties in Moldova
Political parties in Transnistria
Communism in Transnistria